is a Japanese weightlifter. He competed in the men's featherweight event at the 1988 Summer Olympics.

References

1965 births
Living people
Japanese male weightlifters
Olympic weightlifters of Japan
Weightlifters at the 1988 Summer Olympics
Place of birth missing (living people)